Hagerstown is a city in Washington County, Maryland, 
United States, and the county seat of Washington County. The population of Hagerstown city proper at the 2020 census was 43,527, and the population of the Hagerstown metropolitan area (extending into West Virginia) was 293,844. Hagerstown ranks as Maryland's sixth-largest incorporated city and is the largest city in the Panhandle.

Hagerstown has a distinct topography, formed by stone ridges running from northeast to southwest through the center of town. Geography accordingly bounds its neighborhoods. These ridges consist of upper Stonehenge limestone. Many of the older buildings were built from this stone, which is easily quarried and dressed onsite. It whitens in weathering and the edgewise conglomerate and wavy laminae become distinctly visible, giving a handsome and uniquely "Cumberland Valley" appearance. Several of Hagerstown's churches are constructed of Stonehenge limestone. Its value and beauty as building rock may be seen particularly in St. John's Episcopal Church on West Antietam Street and the Presbyterian Church at the corner of Washington and Prospect Streets. Brick and concrete eventually displaced this native stone in the construction process.

Hagerstown anchors the Hagerstown metropolitan area, which lies just northwest of the Washington–Baltimore–Northern Virginia, DC–MD–VA–WV Combined Statistical Area in the heart of the Great Appalachian Valley. The population of the metropolitan area in 2020 was 293,844. Greater Hagerstown is the fastest-growing metropolitan area in the state of Maryland and among the fastest growing in the United States, as of 2009.

Despite its semi-rural Western Maryland setting, Hagerstown is a center of transit and commerce. Interstates 81 and 70, CSX, Norfolk Southern, and the Winchester and Western railroads, and Hagerstown Regional Airport form an extensive transportation network for the city. Hagerstown is also the chief commercial and industrial hub for a greater Tri-State Area that includes much of Western Maryland as well as significant portions of South Central Pennsylvania and the Eastern Panhandle of West Virginia. Hagerstown has often been referred to as, and is nicknamed, the Hub City. A person born in Hagerstown is officially called a Hagerstonian.

History

Founding

In 1739, Jonathan Hager, a German immigrant from Pennsylvania and a volunteer Captain of Scouts, purchased  of land in the Great Appalachian Valley between the Blue Ridge and Allegheny Mountains in Maryland and called it Hager's Fancy. In 1762, Hager officially founded the town of Elizabethtown which he named after his wife, Elizabeth Kershner. Fourteen years later, Jonathan Hager became known as the "Father of Washington County" after his efforts helped Hagerstown become the county seat of newly created Washington County, which Hager also helped create from neighboring Frederick County. The City Council changed the community's name to Hager's-Town in 1813 because the name had gained popular usage, and in the following year, the Maryland State Legislature officially endorsed the changing of the town's name.

In 1794, government forces arrested 150 citizens during a draft riot which was staged by protesters in response to the Whiskey Rebellion.

American Civil War
Hagerstown's strategic location at the border between the North and the South made the city a primary staging area and supply center for four major campaigns during the Civil War. In 1861, General Robert Patterson's troops used Hagerstown as a base to attack Virginia troops in the Shenandoah Valley. In the Maryland Campaign of 1862, General James Longstreet's command occupied the town while en route to the Battle of South Mountain and Antietam. In 1863, the city was the site of several military incursions and engagements as Gen. Robert E. Lee's army invaded and retreated in the Gettysburg Campaign. In 1864, Hagerstown was invaded by the Confederate army under Lt. Gen. Jubal Early. On Wednesday, July 6, Early sent 1,500 cavalry, commanded by Brig. Gen. John McCausland, into Hagerstown. The Confederates levied a ransom of $20,000 and a large amount of clothing, in retribution for U.S. destruction of farms, feed and cattle in the Shenandoah Valley. This is in contrast to neighboring Chambersburg, Pennsylvania, which McCausland razed on July 30 when the borough failed to supply the requested ransom of $500,000 in U.S. currency, or $100,000 in gold.

Following the war, in 1872 Maryland and Virginia cooperated to re-inter Confederate dead from their impromptu graves to cemeteries in Hagerstown, Frederick and Shepherdstown, West Virginia. Roughly 60% however, remained unidentified. In 1877, 15 years after the Battle of Antietam, also known as the Battle of Sharpsburg, approximately 2,800 Confederate dead from that battle and also from the battles on South Mountain were re-interred in Washington Confederate Cemetery, within Rose Hill Cemetery in Hagerstown.

Railroads
Hagerstown's nickname of the "Hub City" originated from the large number of railroads (and roads) that served the city. Hagerstown was the center of the Western Maryland Railway and an important city on the Pennsylvania, Norfolk and Western, Baltimore and Ohio, and Hagerstown and Frederick Railroads. Currently, the city is a vital location on CSX, Norfolk Southern, and the Winchester and Western Railroads.

Hagerstown was formerly served by the Hagerstown & Frederick Railway, an interurban trolley system, from 1896 to 1947.

Little Heiskell

One of the most recognizable symbols of Hagerstown is the weathervane known as "Little Heiskell". Named after the German tinsmith Benjamin Heiskell who crafted it in 1769 in the form of a Hessian soldier, it stood atop the Market House first and City Hall second for a combined 166 years. It was moved from the Market House to City Hall in 1824.

During the Civil War era, the weathervane gained its characteristic bullet hole from a Confederate sharpshooter, who won a bet after shooting it from a full city block away.

In 1935, the original was retired to the Museum of the Washington County Historical Society, later to be moved to its present display in the Jonathan Hager House. An exact replica has replaced it atop City Hall.

The weathervane has been depicted in the city's annual Mummers Day Parade by Charles Harry Rittenhouse, Sr. sporting the necessary accoutrements of a German mercenary soldier.

Little Heiskell was at one time the mascot of North Hagerstown High School.

Aviation heritage
Hagerstown's first aircraft production came in World War I with the Maryland Pressed Steel Company building the Bellanca CD biplane in hopes of securing government contracts.

From 1931 to 1984, Fairchild Aircraft was based in Hagerstown and was by far the area's most prominent employer. The importance of the company to the city and the country as a whole earned Hagerstown its former nickname "Home of the Flying Boxcar".

Fairchild moved to Hagerstown from Farmingdale, New York, in 1931 after Sherman Fairchild purchased a majority stock interest in Kreider-Reisner Aircraft Company of Hagerstown in 1929. Among Fairchild's products during World War II were PT-19/PT-23/PT-26 (Cornell) and AT-21 trainers, C-82 "Packet" cargo planes and missiles. At its height in World War II, Fairchild employed directly and indirectly up to 80% of Hagerstown's workforce or roughly 10,000 people.

In the postwar era, Fairchild continued to produce aircraft in Hagerstown such as C-123 Provider, Fairchild F-27 and Fairchild Hiller FH-227, FH-1100, C-26 Metroliner, UC-26 Metroliner, Fairchild Republic A-10 Thunderbolt II, and the Fairchild T-46 jet trainer.
All production ceased in Hagerstown in 1984 and the company moved elsewhere. Presently, the company is based in San Antonio, Texas, and after a series of mergers and acquisitions, is known as M7 Aerospace.

The Hagerstown Aviation Museum shows many of these original aircraft. Among the ones on display are: 1939 F24/UC-61C, 1945 C-82A, 1943 PT-19A, and the 1953 C-119. The museum is located near Hagerstown Regional Airport in the airport's former terminal.

Hagerstown is also the birthplace of Salisbury, Maryland-based Piedmont Airlines which started out as Henson Aviation. It was founded by Richard A. Henson in 1931. Today, Hagerstown Regional Airport-Richard A. Henson Field is named as such in honor of the airlines' founder.

Today, only small to medium-sized aviation companies remain in the area, e.g., Sierra Nevada Corporation, a defense electronics engineering and manufacturing contractor.

Geography

Location and topography
Hagerstown is located at  (39.642771, −77.719954). It is situated south of the Mason–Dixon line and north of the Potomac River and between the Blue Ridge and Allegheny Mountains in a part of the Great Appalachian Valley known regionally as Cumberland Valley and locally as Hagerstown Valley. The community also lies within proximity of Pennsylvania, West Virginia, and Virginia.

Major waterways within Hagerstown include Hamilton Run and Antietam Creek that are tributaries of the Potomac River.

Climate
Hagerstown is situated in the transition between the humid subtropical climate zone (Köppen Cfa) and the humid continental climate zone (Köppen Dfa), with hot, humid summers and cool to moderately cold winters. Precipitation is moderate, averaging  annually, and is somewhat evenly distributed throughout the year, with a slight winter minimum and a maximum in May and June.

Demographics

2010 census
As of the census of 2010, there were 39,662 people, 16,449 households, and 9,436 families residing in the city. The racial makeup of the city was 75.8% White, 15.5% African American, 0.3% Native American, 1.3% Asian, 0.1% Pacific Islander, 2.1% from other races, and 5.1% from two or more races. Hispanic or Latino of any race were 5.6% of the population.

There were 16,449 households, of which 32.9% had children under the age of 18 living with them, 33.6% were married couples living together, 18.4% had a female householder with no husband present, 5.4% had a male householder with no wife present, and 42.6% were non-families. 34.5% of all households were made up of individuals, and 10.5% had someone living alone who was 65 years of age or older. The average household size was 2.36 and the average family size was 3.04.

The median age in the city was 34.5 years. 25.8% of residents were under the age of 18; 9.5% were between the ages of 18 and 24; 28.6% were from 25 to 44; 24% were from 45 to 64; and 12.3% were 65 years of age or older. The gender makeup of the city was 47.3% male and 52.7% female. Between 2011 and 2015, 26.8% of the population lived in poverty.

2000 census
As of the U.S. census of 2000, there were 36,687 people, 15,849 households, and 9,081 families residing in the city. Updated July 1, 2008, census estimates reflect Hagerstown having 39,728 people, an increase of 8.3% from the year 2000.

The racial makeup of the city was 85.95% White, 10.15% Black, 1.77% Hispanic or Latino, 0.25% Native American, 0.96% Asian, 0.04% Pacific Islander, 0.83% from other races, and 1.83% from two or more races. There were 17,154 males and 19,533 females residing in the city.

There were 15,849 households, out of which 29.5% had children under the age of 18 living with them, 36.8% were married couples living together, 15.9% had a female householder with no husband present, and 42.7% were non-families. 35.4% of all households were made up of individuals, and 12.9% had someone living alone who was 65 years of age or older. The average household size was 2.26 and the average family size was 2.93.

In the city, the population was spread out, with 25.6% under the age of 18, 9.0% from 18 to 24, 31.0% from 25 to 44, 20.1% from 45 to 64, and 14.3% who were 65 years of age or older. The median age was 35 years. For every 100 females, there were 87.8 males. For every 100 females age 18 and over, there were 83.6 males.

The median income for a household in the city was $30,796, and the median income for a family was $38,149. Males had a median income of $31,200 versus $22,549 for females. The per capita income for the city was $17,153. About 15.1% of families and 18.1% of the population were below the poverty line, including 27.0% of those under age 18 and 13.7% of those age 65 or over.

Government

Mayor
The current city executive or Mayor of Hagerstown is Tekesha Martinez. She has served as the city's first black mayor since February 2023. Martinez was unanimously selected by the city council to become mayor after Emily Keller resigned to take a position in Governor Wes Moore's cabinet. The mayor is a nonpartisan position.

Past Mayors:

 2023–Present Tekesha Martinez
 2020–2023 Emily Keller
 2016–2020 Robert E. Bruchey II
 2012–2016 David S. Gysberts (D)
 2006–2012 Robert E. Bruchey II (R)
 2005–2006 Richard F. Trump (R)
 2001–2005 William M. Breichner (D)

 1997–2001 Robert E. Bruchey II (R)
 1985–1997 Steven T. Sager (D)
 1981–1985 Donald R. Frush (R)
 1973–1981 Varner L. Paddock (R)
 1965–1973 Herman L. Mills (R)

 1953–1965 Winslow F. Burhans
 1949–1953 Herman L. Mills (R)
 1941–1949 Richard H. Sweeney
 1937–1941 W. Lee Elgin
 1933–1937 I. M. Wertz

City Council
The nonpartisan representative body of Hagerstown is known as the City Council. Its current members are Kristin Aleshire, Tiara Burnett, Robert Bruchey II,  and Shelley McIntire.

Florence Murdock served as the city's first female councilperson after being appointed in 1985. There have been two times since then where a majority of the council's five seats have been held by women; when there were three councilwomen during a period from 2005 to 2009, and from 2020-2023, where three councilwomen were inaugurated in November 2020. The council currently has two men and two women as Tekesha Martinez was selected to become mayor to fill the vacant seat.

In 2005, Alesia Parson was elected as the first person of color to serve on city council. Since then, Tiara Burnett and Tekesha Martinez have been elected in 2020 as the second and third black city councilmembers. Councilwomen Burnett and Martinez are the first black councilmembers to serve concurrently.

Other representation
Paul D. Corderman (R) serves the Hagerstown area in the Maryland Senate while Brooke Grossman (D) represents Hagerstown in the Maryland House of Delegates. David Trone (D) serves Maryland's 6th congressional district which includes Hagerstown.

Economy
Once primarily an industrial community, Hagerstown's economy depended heavily on railroad transportation and manufacturing, notably of aircraft, trucks, automobiles, textiles, and furniture. Today, the city has a diversified, stable business environment with modern service companies in various fields as well as continued strength in manufacturing and transportation in railroads and highways. Surrounding Hagerstown, there has been and continues to be a strong agricultural presence while tourism, especially with respect to the retail sector, also provides support to the local economy.

Healthcare
 Meritus Medical Center (a part of Meritus Health), acute care inpatient and outpatient facility.
 Western Maryland Hospital Center, chronic-care state-run health center.
 Brook Lane Psychiatric Center, private mental health facility.

Shopping
Hagerstown has 2 major shopping malls:
 Hagerstown Premium Outlets, a 100+ store outlet mall which attracts visitors from Washington and Baltimore as well as nearby counties.
 Valley Mall, anchored by JCPenney, Belk, Old Navy, and Regal Cinemas 16.

Infrastructure

Highways
  Interstate 70 (runs east to Baltimore and west to Utah)
  Interstate 81 (runs north to Northern New York and south to Eastern Tennessee)
  U.S. Route 11 (runs parallel to I-81)
  U.S. Route 40 (runs parallel to I-70)
  U.S. Route 40 Alternate (runs parallel to US 40 in Western Maryland)
  Maryland Route 58
  Maryland Route 60
  Maryland Route 64
  Maryland Route 65
  Maryland Route 144
  Maryland Route 632

Mass transportation

 Washington County Transit buses provide transportation within the city. More limited service is available to surrounding communities in Washington County.
 The Maryland Transit Administration operates the 505 Commuter Bus on weekdays to Shady Grove Metro Station, where riders can transfer to WMATA Red Line to reach Washington, D.C.
 Miller Cabs and Turner Vans service the Hagerstown area but are usually available only upon request. Downtown Taxi! offers cab service people can hail in the downtown vicinity.
 Greyhound Lines and Atlantic Charter Buses provide coach bus service to major cities near and far including directly to Baltimore, Harrisburg, Richmond, and Washington.
 Hagerstown Regional Airport , also known as Richard A. Henson Field, is located approximately  due north of Hagerstown off U.S. Route 11 and Interstate 81. It is a frequent landing site for the U.S. President on the way to Camp David.
 Despite being at the crossroads of CSX, Norfolk Southern, and the Winchester and Western railroads, there is no passenger rail service in Hagerstown. Martinsburg, WV offers Amtrak and MARC Train service to Union Station in Washington, D.C., while Frederick offers MARC commuter rail service as well.

Culture

Historical sites
Hagerstown's location at the center of the Western Maryland region makes it an ideal starting point for touring, especially with respect to the Civil War. Antietam National Battlefield, the site of the bloodiest single day in American history, is located in nearby Sharpsburg. South Mountain State Battlefield is also located in Washington County in Boonsboro. Gettysburg, Monocacy, and Harpers Ferry battlefields are all located within a 30-minute drive of Hagerstown.

Fort Frederick State Park, which features a restored fort used in the French and Indian War, is west of the city in nearby Big Pool, Maryland.

Washington Monument State Park, near Boonsboro, pays tribute to the country's first president, George Washington. It is the oldest structure to honor the 'father of our country.'

Hagerstown is also home to the Chesapeake and Ohio Canal National Historical Park Headquarters.

The city and surrounding vicinity also has a number of sites and districts listed on the National Register of Historic Places. They include the Antietam Furnace Complex Archeological Site, Antietam Hall, Brightwood, Colonial Theatre, Ditto Knolls, Dorsey-Palmer House, Elliot-Bester House, Jacob M. Funk Farm, Garden Hill, Good-Hartle Farm, Hager House, Hagerstown Armory, Hagerstown Charity School, Hagerstown City Park Historic District, Hagerstown Commercial Core Historic District, Hagerstown Historic District, Houses At 16-22 East Lee Street, Lantz-Zeigler House, Lehman's Mill Historic District, Long Meadows, Maryland Theatre, Henry McCauley Farm, Oak Hill Historic District, Old Forge Farm, Old Washington County Library, Paradise Manor, Potomac-Broadway Historic District, Price-Miller House, Rockland Farm, Rockledge, Rohrer House, South Prospect Street Historic District, Trovinger Mill, Valentia, Washington County Courthouse, Western Maryland Railway Station, Western Maryland Railway Steam Locomotive No. 202, and Wilson's Bridge.

Parks and museums

Within the city, there are numerous parks including Hagerstown City Park, which is home to the Washington County Museum of Fine Arts, Mansion House Art Gallery, Western Maryland 202 Locomotive Display and Museum, and the Hager House and Museum (once home of Jonathan Hager, founder of Hagerstown). Outside of the Park, Hagerstown Roundhouse Museum showcases exhibits of Hagerstown's early railroad history. Discovery Station, located downtown, is a hands-on science and technology museum featuring exhibits in numerous galleries and display areas, including the Hagerstown Aviation Museum. Fairgrounds Park is the city's largest active recreation park. It features a baseball field, a BMX track, exercise equipment, an in-line hockey rink, a skatepark, soccer fields, softball fields, and walking trails.

Theater and arts
Hagerstown is home to the Maryland Theatre, a symphony house that plays host to the Maryland Symphony Orchestra and the annual Miss Maryland USA Beauty Pageants. The city also has the Washington County Playhouse, which does dinner theater performances. The Barbara Ingram School for the Arts is a magnet school for gifted art students, located in downtown Hagerstown's arts and entertainment district on South Potomac Street.

Festivals and events

Downtown Hagerstown recently has enjoyed a resurgence and now hosts several popular annual events. The Quad State Beer Fest is a craft beer and music festival that features regional breweries, rock music and entertainment held at various times throughout the year. The Interstate BBQ Festival is a Kansas City Barque Society sanctioned competition which hosts dozens of professional and backyard teams and draws thousands of spectators as a huge regional event. The city draws thousands every year around May–June to the Western Maryland Blues Fest, which showcases blues artists from around the country. The Augustoberfest celebrates Hagerstown's German heritage. The Alsatia Mummers Parade is an annual parade during the Halloween season. It is run by Alsatia Club Inc. and was first run in 1921. 

Fairgrounds Park hosts various events throughout the year like the annual Hagerstown Hispanic Festival held in mid-September and the cities annual July 4th firework show.

Professional sports
Professional baseball in Hagerstown dates to the late nineteenth century. Most recently, the Hagerstown Suns minor-league baseball team played from 1981 to 2020 at Municipal Stadium, a ballpark which stood from 1930 to 2022. Groundbreaking was held in October 2022 for a new baseball stadium intended for a new professional team in the Atlantic League.

To the west of the city lies Hagerstown Speedway, a nationally known dirt-track racing venue. Another professional racing track, Mason-Dixon Dragway, is located just southeast of Hagerstown.

Media

Radio
Hagerstown shares a radio market, the 166th largest in the United States, with Chambersburg and Waynesboro, Pennsylvania. The following box contains all of the radio stations in the area:

Television
Hagerstown is the base for three television stations and shares a Designated Market Area, the sixth largest in the United States, with Washington, D.C.

 WDVM-TV 25 (Ind)

 WWPB 31 (MPT/PBS)

 WWPX 60 (ION)

Education
Initially Hagerstown had one high school known as Hagerstown High School located on Potomac Avenue between the years of 1927 and 1958. It later became North Potomac Middle School after North Hagerstown High School was built on Pennsylvania Avenue and opened in 1958. South Hagerstown High School had already been built and was opened in 1956.

High schools

Public high schools
(Administered by Washington County Public Schools)
 Antietam Academy
 Barbara Ingram School for the Arts
 Evening High School
 North Hagerstown High School
 South Hagerstown High School
 Washington County Technical High School

In addition, many Hagerstown students attend the following:
 Boonsboro High School, Boonsboro
 Clear Spring High School, Clear Spring
 Smithsburg High School, Smithsburg
 Williamsport High School, Williamsport

Private high schools
 Broadfording Christian Academy
 Emmanuel Christian School
 Gateway Academy
 Grace Academy
 Heritage Academy
 St. Mary's Catholic School
 Highland View Academy
 St. James School
 Truth Christian Academy
 St. Maria Goretti High School

Colleges and Universities
 Hagerstown Community College, 2-year public community college.
 University System of Maryland at Hagerstown, a regional higher education center of the University System of Maryland offering various bachelor's, master's and doctoral degree programs in connection with other state colleges and universities in Maryland.

Former Colleges and Universities 

 Antietam Bible College, Biblical Seminary, and Graduate School
 Kaplan University, Hagerstown Campus, formerly known as Kaplan College and Hagerstown Business College.
 Kee Mar College, former women's college
 Mount Saint Mary's University, Hagerstown Campus, offered Masters of Business Administration (MBA) degrees.

Notable people
 See People from Hagerstown.

Sister cities and municipal partnerships
  Wesel, North Rhine-Westphalia, Germany (since March 10, 1952)
  Hagerstown, Indiana, United States (since October 1, 2013)
  Xinjin, China (since March 22, 2016)

Metropolitan area

Hagerstown–Martinsburg, MD–WV MSA consists of three counties:
 Washington County, Maryland
 Berkeley County, West Virginia
 Morgan County, West Virginia

The Primary Cities are Hagerstown, MD and Martinsburg, WV. Other communities in the MSA include: Halfway, MD, Paramount-Long Meadow, MD, Fountainhead-Orchard Hills, MD, Robinwood, MD, Maugansville, MD, Boonsboro, MD, Smithsburg, MD, Williamsport, MD, Falling Waters, WV, Hedgesville, WV, Inwood, WV and Berkeley Springs, WV.

The metropolitan area's population in 2000 was 222,771. The 2008 estimate is 263,753, making Greater Hagerstown the 169th largest metropolitan area in the United States. The growth rate from 2000 to 2008 is +18.4%, the 48th highest among metropolitan areas in the entire country and the highest in Maryland (and in West Virginia). The growth is mostly due to the influx of people from Washington, D.C., and Baltimore, MD.

References

External links

 
 
 

 City of Hagerstown website
 Hagerstown-Washington County Convention & Visitor's Bureau
 Hagerstown-Washington County Chamber of Commerce
 Hagerstown Downtown Directory
 Archive of Maryland Online Encyclopedia Hagerstown
 
 WHILBR - Western Maryland's Historical Library
 Washington County Free Library - Historic Newspaper Indexing Project

 
County seats in Maryland
Populated places established in 1762
Cities in Washington County, Maryland
1762 establishments in Maryland
Cities in Maryland
Cities in the Baltimore–Washington metropolitan area